Judgement Day is the second studio album by American rapper Esham, released April 9, 1992. On June 6, 2006, a Judgement Day box set was issued, containing both original volumes and previously unreleased material.

Production 

Reel Life Productions founder and Esham's brother James Smith decided that Esham should record a double album following the release of Prince's Love Symbol Album. Smith thought that if an R&B artist could record a double album, a rapper should record a double album. However, it is not the first double album in hip hop, as previously DJ Jazzy Jeff & The Fresh Prince released He's the DJ, I'm the Rapper, which was a double album in its original vinyl configuration.

Music 
While the lyrical content of Judgement Day is similar to that of Esham's debut, Boomin' Words from Hell, the music features a heavier use of rock samples.

Release history 
Judgement Day was released separately in two volumes, Day and Night, on April 9, 1992. On June 6, 2006, a Judgement Day box set was released, featuring both original volumes remastered, two volumes of previously unreleased material, the exclusive album Martyr City, an illustrated booklet with a short autobiography written by Esham detailing the days of the original Judgement Day release as well as a background story for Martyr City, a live concert DVD, deluxe packaging and a Certificate of Authenticity.

Reception 
Allmusic's Jason Birchmeier wrote that Judgement Day, Vol. 1 "may not be his most well-crafted work, but it certainly stands as his most inspired work of the '90s", while Vol. 2 "isn't quite as strong as the first volume, suffering mostly from a number of weak tracks [...] the first volume doesn't rely quite so much on cheap shock, instead focusing on evocative horror motifs, making Judgement Day, Vol. 2 the less important of the two."

Track listing

References

1992 albums
2006 compilation albums
Albums produced by Esham
Esham albums
Reel Life Productions albums
Horrorcore albums